This is a list of current and former Roman Catholic churches in the Roman Catholic Archdiocese of Santa Fe. The archdiocese includes 93 parishes and 226 missions and covers 19 counties in central and northeastern New Mexico, including the cities of Albuquerque and Santa Fe. The archdiocese is divided for administrative purposes into eight deaneries.

The cathedral church of the diocese is the Cathedral Basilica of Saint Francis of Assisi in Santa Fe.

Santa Fe Deanery

Albuquerque A Deanery

Albuquerque B Deanery

Albuquerque C Deanery

Northeast Deanery

Northwest Deanery

Southeast Deanery

Southwest Deanery

References

 
Santa Fe